Italy competed at the 1963 Mediterranean Games in Naples, Italy.

Medals

Athletics

Men

References

External links
Mediterranean Games Athletic results at Gbrathletics.com

Nations at the 1963 Mediterranean Games
1963
Mediterranean Games